The Roman Catholic Diocese of Sale is a suffragan Latin Church diocese of Archdiocese of Melbourne, that covers the south east of Victoria, Australia. The diocese was established in 1887.

Gregory Bennet was appointed bishop of Sale on 27 June 2020.

History
The Diocese of Sale was established by Pope Leo XIII on 26 April 1887. The first bishop of the Diocese, James Francis Corbett, was a priest of the Diocese of Limerick, Ireland, who was responsible for the Mission (later Parish) of St Kilda and Chancellor of the Archdiocese of Melbourne at the time of his appointment. Corbett was consecrated bishop on 25 August 1887 in St Mary's Church, East St Kilda, by Archbishop of Melbourne, Thomas Carr.  Bishop Corbett consecrated St Patrick's Cathedral, Melbourne, on account of his superior vocal ability.

The second Bishop of Sale, Patrick Phelan, saw to the establishment of a school system in the Diocese. The fourth bishop, Patrick Lyons, saw the 1959 change to the boundaries of the Diocese, which incorporated into Sale from the Melbourne Archdiocese the parishes of Berwick, Cranbourne, Pakenham, Iona, Maryknoll, Koo Wee Rup, Dalyston and Korrumburra. These parishes, while they were mainly rural areas at the time, have seen rapid growth and are now considered outer suburbs of the Melbourne metropolitan area.

Bishops

Ordinaries

The following individuals have served as Roman Catholic Bishop of Sale:

{| class="wikitable"
!Order
!Name
!Date enthroned
!Reign ended
!Term of office
!Reason for term end
|-
|align="center"| || James Francis Corbett ||align="center"| 13 May 1887 ||align="center"| 29 May 1912 ||align="right"|  || Died in office
|-
|align="center"| || Patrick Phelan ||align="center"| 2 November 1912 ||align="center"| 5 January 1925 ||align="right"|  || Died in office
|-
|align="center"| || Richard Ryan C.M. ||align="center"| 10 March 1926 ||align="center"| 16 June 1957  ||align="right"|  || Died in office
|-
|align="center"| || Patrick Lyons ||align="center"| 16 June 1957  ||align="center"| 13 August 1967 ||align="right"|  || Died in office
|-
|align="center"| || Arthur Fox ||align="center"| 29 November 1967 ||align="center"| 25 February 1981 ||align="right"|  || Retired and appointed Bishop Emeritus of Sale
|-
|align="center"| || Eric D'Arcy ||align="center"| 25 February 1981 ||align="center"| 24 October 1988 ||align="right"|  || Elevated to Archbishop of Hobart
|-
|align="center"| || Jeremiah Coffey ||align="center"| 8 April 1989 ||align="center"| 2 January 2008 ||align="right"|  || Retired and appointed Bishop Emeritus of Sale
|-
|align="center"| || Christopher Prowse  ||align="center"| 18 June 2009 ||align="center"| 19 November 2013 ||align="right"|  || Appointed Archbishop of CanberraGoulburn
|-
|align="center"| || Patrick O'Regan ||align="center" | 26 February 2015 ||align="center" | 19 March 2020 ||align="right"|  || Appointed Archbishop of Adelaide
|-
|align="center"| || Gregory Bennet ||align="center" | 8 December 2020 ||align="center" | Incumbent ||align="right"|  || 
|}

Coadjutor bishop
Patrick Francis Lyons (1956-1957)

Other priests of this diocese who became bishops
Patrick Mary O'Donnell, appointed Coadjutor Archbishop of Brisbane in 1948
Noel Desmond Daly, appointed Bishop of Sandhurst in 1979
Michael Joseph McKenna, appointed Bishop of Bathurst in 2009

Cathedral
St Mary's Cathedral, Sale is the cathedral church of the diocese, under the patronage of Our Lady of Perpetual Help.  Purpose-built as a cathedral, St Mary's boasts a Romanesque onyx high altar, notable stained glass windows and a large statue of Mary Help of Christians as its features.  Four of Sale's bishops are buried in the cathedral: Bishop Corbett lies in the main section of the church beneath the front rows of pews on the right hand side and Bishops Ryan, Lyons and Fox are interred in the Lady Chapel.

Boundaries
The diocese covers south east Victoria, from the eastern suburbs of Melbourne to the New South Wales border, including all of Gippsland.

See also

 Roman Catholicism in Australia

References

External links

Roman Catholic Diocese of Sale

 
Sale
Sale, Roman Catholic Diocese of
Religious organizations established in 1887
1887 establishments in Australia
Sale